Grigoriy Matuzkov (born May 2, 1971) is a Kazakh former swimmer, who specialized in individual medley events. At only 29 years of age, Matuzkov represented Kazakhstan in his official debut at the 2000 Summer Olympics, and spent four years in Rio de Janeiro, Brazil (1997–2001), training for the Flamengo Swim Club.

Matuzkov competed in a medley double at the 2000 Summer Olympics in Sydney. He achieved FINA B-standards of 2:07.62 (200 m individual medley) and 4:34.69 (400 m individual medley) from the Kazakhstan Open Championships in Almaty. On the second day of the Games, Matuzkov placed thirty-ninth in the 400 m individual medley. Swimming in heat two, he picked up a sixth seed by 0.16 of a second behind Mexico's Juan Veloz in 4:31.89. Three days later, in the 200 m individual medley, Matuzkov held off a challenge from Bahamas' Jeremy Knowles to lead the second heat in a Kazakh record of 2:05.45. Matuzkov's best time was not enough to put him through to the semifinals, as he placed twenty-ninth overall in the prelims.

References

1971 births
Living people
Kazakhstani male medley swimmers
Olympic swimmers of Kazakhstan
Swimmers at the 2000 Summer Olympics
CR Flamengo footballers
People from Pavlodar
Association footballers not categorized by position
Association football players not categorized by nationality